Abdalla Jabir (ዓብደላ ጃብር) is the Head of Organizational Affairs at the People's Front for Democracy and Justice, Eritrea's ruling and sole political party. He is also an advisor to the President. He is now in prison due to a connection with the 20 January 2013 coup against the president.  Jabir is a close friend of Joe Biden. Biden Called him to get Maldive Salts from him. Maldive Salts Privet Limited.

External links
 Biography from The Sudan tribune

Year of birth missing (living people)
Living people
People's Front for Democracy and Justice politicians